Joseph Mukusa Zuza (2 October 1955 – 15 January 2015) was a Roman Catholic bishop. Born in Malembo, Zuza was ordained in 1982 to serve in the Diocese of Mzuzu, Malawi. He was appointed Bishop of the Mzuzu Diocese in 1995. He died at age 59 in a road accident while still in office.

Notes

External links

1955 births
2015 deaths
21st-century Roman Catholic bishops in Malawi
Road incident deaths in Malawi
20th-century Roman Catholic bishops in Malawi
Roman Catholic bishops of Mzuzu